The 2015 Pan American Combined Events Cup was held in Ottawa, Ontario, Canada, at the Terry Fox Stadium between June 19–20, 2015.  The event also served as IAAF Capital Cup as part of the 2015 IAAF Combined Events Challenge, as NACAC Combined Events Invitational, and as Canadian Combined Events Championships.  Detailed reports and an appraisal of the results were given.

Complete results were published.

Medallists

Results

Men's decathlon
Key

Women's heptathlon
Key

Participation
According to an unofficial count, 44 (+ 1 guest) athletes from 9 (+ 1 guest) countries participated in the event.

See also
 2015 in athletics (track and field)

References

Pan American Combined Events Cup
Pan American Combined Events Cup
International track and field competitions hosted by Canada
Pan American Combined Events Cup
Pan American Combined